Hugh Haughton is an academic, author, editor and specialist in Irish literature and the literature of nonsense.

Born in Cork, Ireland and educated at Leighton Park School and then Cambridge and Oxford, Haughton is a professor at the University of York.

Hugh Haughton's research interests lie in twentieth-century Irish literature, modern poetry and poetics in the United Kingdom, United States and Ireland; psychoanalysis and literature; and the literature of nonsense.

He has written widely and his publications include Penguin's centenary edition of Lewis Carroll's Alice in Wonderland and Through the Looking-Glass and the Chatto Book of Nonsense, an anthology of nonsense poetry.

Publications
Hugh Haughton's books include:

The Chatto Book of Nonsense Poetry (1988) (ed.)
Rudyard Kipling, Wee Willie Winkie (1988) (ed.)
Lewis Carroll and John Tenniel, Alice's Adventures in Wonderland: AND Through the Looking-Glass (Penguin Classics) (1998) (ed.)
The Uncanny (Penguin Modern Classics) by Sigmund Freud (2003) (ed.)
Second World War Poems (Faber) (2004) (ed.)
The Poetry of Derek Mahon (Oxford, 2007)

References

External links 

 

1948 births 
Living people
British literary historians
Humanities academics
Irish literary critics
Literary critics of English
Academics of the University of York
Alumni of the University of Cambridge
Writers from Cork (city)
Alumni of the University of Oxford
Anthologists